Philip Phillips (January 27, 1874 – April 18, 1959) was a prominent businessman who was particularly active in the Central Florida area.

Education 
Phillips earned a medical degree from Columbia University in New York.

Career 
After that, he established the Dr. P. Phillips Foundation, while Dr. Phillips Inc. remained in the real estate business, particularly as run by his son, Howard Phillips.

Legacy 
Many places and establishments are named in his honor in the Orlando, Florida area, including the community of Doctor Phillips, Florida (a suburb of Orlando), Dr. P. Phillips Baby Place at Winter Park Memorial Hospital, Orlando Health Dr. P. Phillips Hospital, The Dr. Phillips House which is now a restored Historic Inn where Dr. Phillips had lived, Dr. Phillips High School, and the Dr. Phillips Center for the Performing Arts, which opened in 2014, and Dr. Phillips Academic Commons located at UCF's downtown Orlando campus.

The Dr. Phillips name has been a major economic and philanthropic presence in the Central Florida community for over 100 years.  Dr. Phillips Charities honors the Phillips family legacy through its support of local nonprofit organizations that live up to the family’s motto of “helping others help themselves” in the areas of health, education, arts, youth and social services within the Central Florida community, as well as organizations that preserve the free enterprise system and protect private property rights. Dr. Phillips Charities consists of Dr. Phillips, Inc. and The Dr. P. Phillips Foundation.  To date, the combined organizations have made grants, pledges and program related investments totaling over 220 million.

References

External links
The Dr. P. Phillips Foundation Official Website
Dr. Phillips High School
Dr. P. Phillips Hospital
Dr. Phillips, Florida information on City-Data.com
Dr. Phillips Center for the Performing Arts

1874 births
1959 deaths
American real estate businesspeople
People from Orlando, Florida
Columbia University Vagelos College of Physicians and Surgeons alumni
19th-century American businesspeople
20th-century American businesspeople
Philanthropists from Florida
Businesspeople from Florida